Caminus strongyla is a sponge species in the family Geodiidae. The species is found off the coasts of Japan and was first described by Kazuo Hoshino in 1981.

References

Tetractinellida
Animals described in 1981